Jean-Jacques Avril "the elder" (1744–1831) was a French artist and reproductive engraver born in Paris who made about 540 engravings, some of large dimensions. He was a pupil of Johann Georg Wille. He died in Paris in 1831.

His prints bear addresses in the Rue de la Huchette and the Rue du Petit Bourbon.

Works
His engravings include:
Study Wanting to Hold Back Time; after François-Guillaume Ménageot
La Vierge au linge; after Raphael.
Mars Going to Battle; after Rubens.
Mars Returning from Battle; after the same.
A Shepherd and Shepherdess; called the Croc-en-jambe; after the same.
Apollo with the Seasons, dancing; after Poussin.
Diana and Actaeon; after Albani.
Diana and Callisto; after the same.
Venus revenging herself on Psyche; after De Troy.
Pygmalion and Galatea; after Marillier.
St. Genevieve; after C. van Loo.
Fishermen returning; after Vernet.
Travellers in a Storm; after the same.
The Shipwreck; dated 1775; after the same.
The Double Reoompense of Merit; after P. A. Wille, 1784.
French Patriotism; after the same. 1788.
The Taking of Courtrai; after Van der Meulen. 1782.
The Passage of the Rhine; after Berchem.
Catherine II on her Travels; after F. de Meys. 1790.
Ulysses and Penelope; after Le Barbier.
Combat of the Horatii and Curiatii; after the same. 1787.

References

Sources
 

1744 births
1831 deaths
18th-century engravers
19th-century engravers
Engravers from Paris
18th-century French painters
French male painters
19th-century French painters
19th-century French male artists
18th-century French male artists